Cedar Hill School may refer to:

 Cedar Hill School, Bernards Township, New Jersey, an elementary school in Bernards Township, New Jersey, USA
 Cedar Hill Collegiate High School, an early college high school in Cedar Hill, Texas, USA
 Cedar Hill High School, a public high school in Cedar Hill, Texas, USA
 Cedar Hill Prep School, a private school in Somerset, New Jersey, USA

See also
 Cedar Hill Independent School District
 Cedar Hill (disambiguation)
 Northwest High School (Cedar Hill, Missouri)
 Trinity Christian School – Cedar Hill